Seka may refer to:

 Monique Séka, Ivorian singer.
 Seka (actress), an American pornographic actress.
 Seka Aleksić, a Bosnian and Serbian singer.
 Şekä, a dwarf in Tatar mythology
mythology.
 SEKA (oil company), a petroleum bunkering company.
 Seka District,  a district (amphoe) in Bueng Kan Province, Thailand.
 Seka, Thailand, subdistrict in Seka District.
 Seka, Ethiopia.
 Seka or Hsekiu, Predynastic ancient Egyptian king.